Katembri (Catrimbi [sic], Kariri de Mirandela, Mirandela) was a divergent language of Bahia, northeastern Brazil that appears to be distantly related to Taruma (Kaufman 1990).

It is known only from about 100 words collected in the early 1960s from João Manoel Domingos, an elderly rememberer with vague memories of the language.

Katembri was spoken at the mission of Saco dos Morcegos, now known as Mirandela, Bahia.

Other languages with this name
Xukuru-Kariri is a variety of Xokó, which may be a Kariri language. The name Kiriri is shared by Dzubukuá, another Kariri language, and by Xukuru.

Vocabulary

Bandeira (1972)
For a word list of Katembri (Kariri of Mirandela) by Bandeira (1972), see the corresponding Portuguese article.

Loukotka (1968)
Loukotka (1968) lists the following basic vocabulary items for Katembri, based on a 1951 word list by Alfred Métraux.

{| class="wikitable"
! gloss !! Katembri
|-
| ear || eri-ntuka
|-
| tooth || eri-kofomuki
|-
| sun || bozofoshi
|-
| moon || boa
|-
| tobacco || boze
|}

Métraux (1951)
A word list for Kariri of Mirandela from Métraux (1951) is reproduced below, with both original French glosses and translated English glosses.

{| class="wikitable sortable"
! French gloss (original) !! English gloss (translated) !! Kariri of Mirandela
|-
| tête || head || quitipati
|-
| cheveux || hair || idiqui-quetipati
|-
| cils || eyelashes || panadô
|-
| oreille || ear || erintucá
|-
| dent || tooth || ericofomuqui, uiça (?)
|-
| langue || tongue || buniqui
|-
| lèvre || lip || biquiri
|-
| épaule || shoulder || pufixié
|-
| bras || arm || bunififufa
|-
| main || hand || quifi
|-
| doigt || finger || comodoi
|-
| ventre || belly || mudô
|-
| fesses || buttocks || coquibi
|-
| cuisses || thighs || botiti
|-
| genou || knee || cofi
|-
| tibia || tibia || cocudú
|-
| mollet || calf || ila
|-
| chevilles || ankles || popu
|-
| plante du pied || sole || bebaá
|-
| orteil || toe || ticá
|-
| soleil || sun || bozofoxi
|-
| lune || moon || boa
|-
| pluie || rain || ifó
|-
| éclair || lightning || irirumaré
|-
| croix-du-sud || Southern Cross || quipapoqui
|-
| étoile || star || detiquimen
|-
| feu || fire || quééfurtitiu
|-
| forêt || forest || sequieifi
|-
| cerf || deer || prucô
|-
| pécari || peccary || faú
|-
| nandou || rhea || bruan
|-
| cutia || agouti || foifro
|-
| coati || coati || bizaui
|-
| tamanoir || anteater || bizaui
|-
| lapin || rabbit || miriú
|-
| serpent || snake || anguiú
|-
| tatou || armadillo || bozucú
|-
| renard || fox || jacá
|-
| caméléon || chameleon || granharó
|-
| jaguar || jaguar || boiocozzoboingiado
|-
| chèvre || goat || pobifi
|-
| chien || dog || gazzorú
|-
| poule || chicken || apucá
|-
| plantation || plantation || dotitoti
|-
| maïs || maize || paifiquinioré
|-
| haricot || bean || buzufuxi
|-
| courge || squash || croionho
|-
| manioc || cassava || micu
|-
| tapioca || tapioca || quenêoé
|-
| beiju || beiju || beniti
|-
| tabac || tobacco || bozê, labora
|-
| belle personne || beautiful person || dixi
|-
| personne laide || ugly person || boxé
|-
| personne mariée || married person || fofi
|-
| célibataire || celibate person || coni
|-
| vieillard || old person || chibó
|-
| mauvais blanc || mild white || carai-box
|-
| bon blanc || bright white || carai-fizou
|-
| métis || mixed || carai-naré
|-
| rouge || red || urango-cozzo
|-
| noir || black || arango-naré
|-
| vrai noir || deep black || urango-taré
|}

References

Alain Fabre, 2005, Diccionario etnolingüístico y guía bibliográfica de los pueblos indígenas sudamericanos: KIRIRI.

Katembri–Taruma languages
Indigenous languages of Northeastern Brazil
Extinct languages of South America